John Sanderson Swain (13 April 1914 – 2000) was an English professional footballer who played as a winger.

References

1914 births
2000 deaths
Footballers from Grimsby
English footballers
Association football wingers
Grimsby Town F.C. players
Scunthorpe United F.C. players
English Football League players